Melaku is an Ethiopian name. Notable people with the name include:

Given name
Melaku Belay, leader of the Ethiopian music group Fendika
Melaku Worede (born 1936), Ethiopian agronomist

Surname
LoLa Monroe (born Fershgenet Melaku in 1986), American rapper, model and actress of Ethiopian descent 
Tsega Melaku (born 1968), Israeli author, journalist, and community activist

Ethiopian given names